Qiao Leiying (born 24 August 1989 in Liaoning) is a female Chinese water polo player who was part of the silver medal-winning team at the 2007 World Junior Championship. As an 18-year-old, she competed at the 2008 Summer Olympics where the Chinese team placed 5th. She graduated from Chengdu Sport Institute, and worked as an exterior line on the court.

References
 profile

1989 births
Living people
Chinese female water polo players
Olympic water polo players of China
Sportspeople from Liaoning
Water polo players at the 2008 Summer Olympics
Universiade medalists in water polo
Universiade gold medalists for China
Medalists at the 2009 Summer Universiade
21st-century Chinese women